Salimesophilobacter is a Gram-positive, anaerobic, heterotrophic and motile genus of bacteria from the family of Clostridiaceae with one known species (Salimesophilobacter vulgaris). Salimesophilobacter vulgaris has been isolated from wastewater from a paper mill in Zhejiang.

References

Clostridiaceae
Bacteria genera
Monotypic bacteria genera
Taxa described in 2013